A Christmas to Remember may refer to:

 A Christmas to Remember (1978 film), American Great Depression TV drama
Kenny & Dolly: A Christmas to Remember, American TV special, broadcast on CBS December 2, 1984 (Once Upon a Christmas)
"A Christmas to Remember", American song from 1984 album Once Upon a Christmas
A Christmas to Remember (album), 1999 American gold album by Amy Grant
A Christmas to Remember, 2020 English romantic novel by Anton Du Beke